Gummerup is a place in Glamsbjerg municipality on the island of Funen, central Denmark.

Famous people
Ambrosius Stub (born 1705 in Gummerup)

Villages in Denmark
Assens Municipality